O10 or O-10 may refer to:
 Loening O-10, an amphibious observation aircraft of the United States Army Air Corps
 , a submarine of the Royal Netherlands Navy
 , a submarine of the United States Navy
 O-10, a pay grade in the United States armed forces; see Uniformed services pay grades of the United States